Emily Jane Browning (born 7 December 1988) is an Australian actress. She made her film debut in the television film The Echo of Thunder (1998), and subsequently appeared in television shows such as High Flyers (1999), Something in the Air (2000–2001), and Blue Heelers (2000–2002). Her breakthrough role was in the 2002 horror film Ghost Ship, which introduced her to a wider audience. In 2005, Browning won the Australian Film Institute International Award for Best Actress for her portrayal of Violet Baudelaire in the film Lemony Snicket's A Series of Unfortunate Events (2004).

Browning is also known for her roles in the horror film The Uninvited (2009), the action film Sucker Punch (2011), and the independent drama Sleeping Beauty (2011). She was named the Breakthrough Performer of The Year by the Hamptons International Film Festival for her role in the latter. Browning's other films include Summer in February, Plush (both 2013), Pompeii (2014), Legend (2015) and Golden Exits (2017). From 2017 to 2021, she starred as Laura Moon in the Starz TV series American Gods. She also had a recurring role in Showtime's drama series The Affair (2018–2019).

Early life and education
Browning was born in Melbourne, Victoria, on 7 December 1988, and is the daughter of Andrew and Shelley Browning. She attended Hurstbridge Learning Co-op and Eltham High School. Browning has two younger brothers, Nicholas and Matthew.

Career

1998–2007
Browning's debut acting role was in the 1998 Hallmark Channel movie The Echo of Thunder. Additional roles in Australian film and television productions soon followed, including recurring roles in the television series Blue Heelers from 2000 to 2002, and Something in the Air from 2000 to 2001. In 2001, Browning appeared as the daughter of the character played by Billy Connolly in The Man Who Sued God.

She made her American film debut in 2002's Ghost Ship, and won an Australian Film Institute Award for Best Young Actress, the same year. In 2003, she appeared opposite Heath Ledger and Orlando Bloom in 2003's Ned Kelly, and reunited with Connolly the following year in the film adaptation of Lemony Snicket's A Series of Unfortunate Events, in which she played Violet Baudelaire.

In 2006, Browning appeared in the music video for Evermore's "Light Surrounding You". In the behind-the-scenes video for the clip, the band stated, "[We] suck as actors, so we decided to get Emily". She attended the L'Oreal Fashion Festival as a festival ambassador on 1 February 2007.

2008–2011
Browning played the lead role in the 2009 horror film The Uninvited, an American remake of the 2003 South Korean film A Tale of Two Sisters. She turned down a request to audition for the role of Bella Swan in Twilight, citing exhaustion, despite an endorsement from series author Stephenie Meyer. In 2009, she was cast as Babydoll in Zack Snyder's action film Sucker Punch, as a replacement for Amanda Seyfried, who dropped out due to scheduling conflicts. Filming took place in Vancouver from September 2009 to January 2010, and the film was released on 25 March 2011. In an interview at Comic-Con, she confirmed that she would be singing in the film, while claiming that her audition tape brought tears to her casting agent's eyes and the song she selected ("Killing Me Softly") was one of Zack Snyder's wife Deborah's favourites, which Browning referred to as the "selling point" on her being cast in the role.

In February 2010, it was announced that Browning would play the lead role in the independent Australian film Sleeping Beauty, directed by Julia Leigh. She replaced Mia Wasikowska, who was committed to a film adaptation of Jane Eyre at the time. The film screened at the 2011 Cannes Film Festival and the Sydney Film Festival. In a review from the festival, Peter Bradshaw of The Guardian called the film "Technically elegant with vehemence and control ... Emily Browning gives a fierce and powerful performance ... There is force and originality in Leigh's work". Fionnuala Halligan in Screen International wrote "Browning has gone the distance for her director and together, they have delivered something here that sometimes catches your breath". At the festival Browning said, "Even reading the screenplay, it made me feel uncomfortable. But that was something that attracted me to it. I would prefer to polarise an audience as opposed to making an entertaining film everybody feels ambivalent about."

2012–present
In 2012, she replaced English actress Ophelia Lovibond as the female lead in the film Summer in February. The film is based on the book of the same title, by Jonathan Smith. In July 2012, Browning was cast in God Help the Girl, a musical film by Belle and Sebastian front-man Stuart Murdoch. Browning played Eve, and the role required live singing. Filming on the production began on 8 July 2012 and wrapped on 12 August 2012.

Browning was cast in Catherine Hardwicke's Plush alongside Cam Gigandet, replacing Evan Rachel Wood (who was originally attached to the project) due to scheduling conflicts. Browning also starred alongside Xavier Samuel whom she met on the set during filming. Magic Magic, directed by Sebastián Silva, screened at the 2013 Sundance Film Festival. Film.com designated the film as a "Top Pick".

Browning starred in the 2014 film Pompeii. The project was filmed in Toronto and the city of Pompeii. Browning took a break from filming on Pompeii, and returned home to Australia to film a music video for the song "No Matter What You Say" by the band Imperial Teen. The video follows Browning as the lead character, conducting a 'live art-piece'.

In 2014, Browning filmed Shangri-La Suite. The story follows two young lovers who break out of a mental hospital in 1974 and set out on a road trip to Los Angeles to fulfill the boy's lifelong dream of killing his idol Elvis Presley, who appears as a supporting character. Luke Grimes and Avan Jogia co-star. The same year, she appeared in Years & Years's "Take Shelter" music video.

In 2015, Browning appeared in the biopic crime thriller Legend, alongside Tom Hardy, who portrayed twin brothers and infamous 1960s London gangsters Reggie and Ronnie Kray. She portrayed Frances Shea, the first wife of Reggie Kray.

Browning was cast in American Gods as Laura Moon. Neil Gaiman, author of the novel, said, "I've been fascinated by Emily Browning since A Series of Unfortunate Events. She has a challenge ahead of her: Laura is a tricky character, and the Laura on the screen is even trickier and more dangerous than the one on the page. She's going to have a wonderful time bringing Laura to life".

In June 2021, it was announced that Browning would replace Anna Paquin in Andrea Pallaoro's drama Monica, joining Trace Lysette, Patricia Clarkson and Adriana Barraza. She is also set to star in Lance Edmands' thriller Brightwater, starring alongside Scoot McNairy and Jack Reynor.

Filmography

Film

Television

Music videos

Video games

Awards and nominations

See also
 Cinema of Australia

References

External links

 
 
 
 
 
 
 
 Emily Browning at Yahoo! Movies

1988 births
20th-century Australian actresses
21st-century Australian actresses
Actresses from Melbourne
Australian child actresses
Australian film actresses
Australian television actresses
Australian video game actresses
Australian voice actresses
Australian expatriate actresses in the United States
Living people
21st-century Australian singers
21st-century Australian women singers